Kawan "KP" Prather (born March 30, 1973) is an American record executive, songwriter, record producer and member of first generation Dungeon Family group P.A. He started his career at LaFace Records and has worked with TLC, OutKast, Goodie Mob, Usher, John Legend, Pink, and Toni Braxton.  At LaFace he also started his own label called Ghet-O-Vision Entertainment.  Under Ghet-O-Vision he signed The YoungBloodZ and a solo M.C., named T.I. and released the albums Against Da Grain and I'm Serious. Most recently (January 2009), KP was appointed Senior Vice President of A&R at Island Def Jam where he signed 15-year-old R&B sensation Khalil. KP also has a production deal for his company Ghet-O-Vision at Island Def Jam, there he has signed, Las Vegas native Mr. Finley. Ghet-O-Vision has also inked a label deal with Interscope Records for up and coming Alabama M.C. Yelawolf.

Biography
In 2000, LaFace was merged into Arista Records.  After working on projects with Usher, Pink, and OutKast, he took a position as Executive Vice President, A&R, Sony Urban, Columbia Records.  While at Columbia Records, KP worked with Omarion, Killer Mike, Destiny's Child, Beyoncé, and signed John Legend.

In 2008, KP teamed up with producer Malay and have a roster of artists and projects they are planning for release in the near future.

Discography

References

External links
Interview, HitQuarters Apr 2001

1973 births
Living people
African-American songwriters
American music industry executives
African-American record producers
American hip hop record producers
Southern hip hop musicians
American rhythm and blues musicians
Musicians from Atlanta
Songwriters from Georgia (U.S. state)
P.A. (group) members
21st-century African-American people
20th-century African-American people